KAST (1370 AM) is an American radio station licensed to serve the community of Astoria, Oregon.  The station is owned by OMG FCC Licenses, LLC. The programming of the station is news–talk, with local programming during drive time hours and at noon, and syndicated programs including Laura Ingraham and Lars Larson the remainder of the day.

History

KAST was originally on 1370 kHz then moved to 1200 kHz in 1939. In 1941 it moved to 1230 kHz as a result of the NARBA agreement. It moved back to 1370 kHz in 1950.

Robert D. Holmes served as a station manager at KAST in the 1930s, prior to serving as Governor of Oregon.

Expanded Band assignment

On March 17, 1997 the Federal Communications Commission (FCC) announced that eighty-eight stations had been given permission to move to newly available "Expanded Band" transmitting frequencies, ranging from 1610 to 1700 kHz, with KAST authorized to move from 1370 to 1700 kHz.

A Construction Permit for the expanded band station was assigned the call letters KCHT on December 22, 1997. However this station was never built, and its Construction Permit was cancelled on January 15, 2004.

References

External links 

FCC History Cards for KAST (covering 1934-1980)

AST
News and talk radio stations in the United States
Astoria, Oregon
Radio stations established in 1935
1935 establishments in Oregon